Sanjay Singh Tiger (born 1974) is an Indian politician of the Bharatiya Janata Party (BJP) from Bhojpur district, Bihar. He has served as MLA in Bihar Legislative Assembly representing the Sandesh constituency from 2010 to 2015. Currently, he is the state spokesperson of BJP's Bihar unit.

Early life 
Sanjay Singh was born at Amrai village near Bihiya in Bhojpur district of Bihar. His father's name is Madhav Singh. Sanjay Singh has studied Bachelor of Arts from A.N. College, Patna in 1993.

Family
His elder brother Dharampal Singh has served 2 times as MLA from Shahpur, Bihar (1990-2000).

Political career 
Before 2010, he was a party worker when he was given ticket from the Sandesh constituency by the BJP. He became an MLA in 2010 by defeating Rameshwar Prasad (ex-MLA), Vijendra Kumar Yadav (sitting MLA) and his younger brother Arun Kumar Yadav, an Independent candidate by a margin of 6,822 votes. 

Sanjay Singh Tiger lost the 2015 Bihar assembly election to Arun Kumar Yadav who was Rashtriya Janata Dal (RJD) candidate from Sandesh. On 19 October 2015, Amit Shah had campaigned for Tiger at a public rally in Jalpura Tapa village, Bhojpur district.

References

External links 

Living people
Bihari politicians
1974 births
Indian Hindus